Dadswell is an English surname. Notable people with the surname include:

Doug Dadswell (born 1964), Canadian ice hockey player
Hilton Dadswell (1903–1952), Australian rugby league footballer
Shane Dadswell (born 1997), South African cricketer 

English-language surnames